Klára Koukalová was the defending champion, but lost in second round to Michaëlla Krajicek.

Unseeded Michaëlla Krajicek won the title by defeating Dinara Safina 6–3, 6–4 in the final.

Seeds
The first two seeds received a bye into the second round.

Draw

Finals

Top half

Bottom half

References
 Main and Qualifying draw

Ordina Open - Women's Singles
Rosmalen Grass Court Championships